Fontana del Bacchino is an Italian Renaissance sculpture of 1560 by Valerio Cioli (1529-1599) in the Boboli Gardens  in Florence featuring a statue in the likeness of the famed dwarf buffoon from the court of Cosimo I de' Medici, Grand Duke of Tuscany, Nano Morgante modeled after Bacchus and riding a tortoise. In 1572 the statue was turned into a fountain.

In popular culture
In the first (of four) programs in the Israeli series "Lool", cast member Uri Zohar recounts how a friend sent a postcard with a photo on the statue, which inspired the members of the Lool group to write a song called "The Man on the Turtle" (lyrics: Shalom Hanoch, music: Robb Huxley). Following the narration the group is shown performing the song, along with footage of a store front display in Tel Aviv which include the postcard and reactions from passers by.

References

Fountains
Florence
1560 in art
1560s sculptures
Marble sculptures
Renaissance sculptures
Sculptures of men in Italy